G

The Glenrowan Football Club was formed in 1905, when they played a match against Greta. The club spent most of its time in the Benalla & District Football League (1946 - 1991) and the Ovens & King Football League (1992 - 2019), when it folded after the 2019 season, due to a lack of players, off field officials, active past players and volunteers.

History
Glenrowan's first documented match was against Winton in 1894, at Winton.

In 1910, Glenrowan wore red, blue and white vertical stripe football jumpers. Glenrowan won the first grand final against Greta South FC, but as Greta South has won the minor premiership, they had the right to challenge Glenrowan in another match for the premiership, in which Greta South won.

Glenrowan joined the Ovens & King Football League in 1992 and played there until 2019.

Three past players of Glenrowan have been awarded an Order of Australia award. They are Linton Briggs, Stuart Devlin and Bill O'Callaghan.

Competition Timeline
1894 - 1905: No official competitions entered, but did play many friendly matches against other local towns.
1906 - Greta & Glenrowan Football Association
1907 - Winton, Glenrowan Thoona Football Association
1908 - Winton Glenrowan Football Association
1909 - ?
1910 - 15 Mile Creek Football Association
1911 - Club in recess
1912 - North Eastern Wednesday Football Association
1913 - 14: Greta Glenrowan Football Association
1915 - 18: Club in recess. WW1
1919 - Greta / Thoona Football Association
1920 - 21: North East Lines Football Association
1922 - 23: Wangaratta Football Association
1924 - 26: Greta / Thoona Football Association
1927 - Ovens & King Football League
1928 - 29: Glenrowan / Thoona Football Association
1930 - 31: ?
1932 - Euroa Line Football Association
1933 - ?
1934 - 38: Tatong Thoona Football Association
1939 - 45: Club in recess, due to WW2
1946 - 91: Benalla & District Football League
1992 - 2019: Ovens & King Football League

Football Grand Finals
Seniors

Reserves

Football League Best & Fairest winners
Seniors
Tatong Thoona Football League
1934 - Harry Billman - 7 votes
1937 - Larry O'Brien - 14 votes

Benalla & District Football League
1957 - John "Mac" Hill - ? votes
1963 - Alan O'Brien - 
1969 - Neville Smedley - 31
1976 - David McCullough - 
1978 - Fred Malloy - 23

Reserves
Ovens & King Football League - (Ross Schutt Medal)
2003 - Brad Laywood
2004 - Brad Laywood
2005 - Rick Lawford
2009 - Brad Laywood
2013 - Clayton Fraser
2014 - Brad Laywood
2017 - Trent Petersen

Football Statistics
Consecutive finals series
 Between 196 and 1981 Glenrowan played in six consecutive Benalla & District Football League finals series.

Consecutive grand finals
 Glenrowan have played in four consecutive Benalla & District Football League grand finals on three separate occasions. 1954 to 1957, 1968 to 1971 and 1978 to 1981. Glenrowan also played in five consecutive grand finals on the Ovens & King Football League from 2013 to 2017.

Consecutive match wins in a row
 In 1983, Glenrowan won all their 18 home and away matches before losing the second semi and preliminary finals in the Benalla & District Football League.

VFL / AFL Players
The following footballer played with Glenrowan, prior to playing AFL football.
 2003: Karl Norman - Carlton

The following footballers played VFL / AFL football prior to playing / coaching Glenrowan FC. The year indicates their first season at Glenrowan.
 1954 - Mac Hill - Collingwood
 2009 - Steve Hickey - North Melbourne
 2013 - Nathan Carroll - Melbourne
 2016 - Brendan Fevola - Carlton

References

Australian rules football clubs in Victoria (Australia)
1905 establishments in Australia
Australian rules football clubs established in 1905